Driven (2008) was the second annual Driven professional wrestling pay-per-view (PPV) event produced by Ring of Honor. It aired on pay-per-view on November 14, 2008 and took place at Boston University's Case Gym in Boston, Massachusetts.

Results

See also
2008 in professional wrestling
List of Ring of Honor pay-per-view events

References

External links
ROH Wrestling.com
Driven (2008) at In Demand.com

Entertainment events in Boston
2008 in Boston
ROH Driven
Professional wrestling in Boston
September 2008 events in the United States
2008 Ring of Honor pay-per-view events